Puto bumbong is a Filipino purple rice cake steamed in bamboo tubes. It is traditionally sold during the Christmas season. It is a type of puto (steamed rice cake).

Etymology
The name is derived from Tagalog puto (steamed rice cakes) and bumbong or bombong ("bamboo tube"). The names are sometimes mistakenly spelled as puto bungbong or puto bongbong.

Description

Puto bumbong is made from a unique heirloom variety of glutinous rice called pirurutong (also called tapol in Visayan) which is deep purple to almost black in color. Pirurutong is mixed with a larger ratio of white glutinous rice (malagkit or malagkit sungsong in Tagalog; pilit in Visayan). Regular white rice may also be used instead of malagkit, to give the dish a less chewy consistency. In the Philippines, puto bumbong is traditionally served in Christmas gatherings together with bibingka.

The rice grains are covered completely in water (traditionally salted water) and allowed to soak overnight. This gives it a slightly acidic fermented aftertaste. The mixture is then drained and packed densely into bamboo tubes and steamed. The sides of the bamboo tubes are traditionally greased with coconut oil, but in modern versions, butter or margarine are commonly used. The rice is traditionally cooked as whole grains, but some versions the rice is ground before or after soaking.

The resulting cylindrical rice cake is then served on banana leaves, slathered with more butter or margarine, and sprinkled with muscovado sugar (or just brown sugar/white sugar with or without sesame seeds) and grated coconut, others had special toppings of puto bumbong like condensed milk (as an alternative ingredient to sugar), or even cheese and leche flan.

Cultural significance

Puto bumbong is commonly served as a snack or breakfast during the Christmas season. It is usually associated with the nine-day traditional Simbang Gabi novena, where stalls serving snacks including puto bumbong are set up outside churches.

Variations
Modern puto bumbong may use metal cylinders or regular food steamers. These versions are commonly shaped into little balls or long narrow tubes (similar to suman). In some modern versions, pirurutong (which is difficult to find) is excluded altogether, and purple food coloring or even purple yam (ube) flour ARE used instead. However, these versions are frowned upon as being inauthentic.

Adaptations of the dish in restaurants include ice-cream flavors, pancakes, cakes, and empanadas.

A variant of puto bumbong from the provinces of Batangas and Pampanga is putong sulot which uses white glutinous rice. Unlike puto bumbong it is available year-round.

Similar Desserts
In Indonesia, Malaysia, and other Maritime Southeast Asian countries, similar desserts are known as kue putu in Indonesian or putu bambu in Malay. They are usually green in color due to the use of pandan leaves for flavoring.

In India (Kerala, Tamil Nadu, and Karnataka) and Sri Lanka, a similar dish is known as puttu or pittu, though it is a savory dish rather than a dessert.

Both of these related dishes are very different in that they use regular (non-sticky) rice flour or ground white rice, but they are all cooked in bamboo tubes.

See also

Tupig
Kakanin
Baye baye
Biko
Espasol
Suman

References

Rice dishes
Philippine desserts
Philippine rice dishes
Foods containing coconut
Christmas food